The Centre d'Entraînement Robert Louis-Dreyfus, commonly referred to as La Commanderie, is the training ground and academy base of French football club Olympique de Marseille. Located in Marseille, the ground was officially opened in July 1991. The training ground was renamed in 2009 after the death of the owner of the club, Robert Louis-Dreyfus.

References

External links
 Centre d'entraînement Robert Louis-Dreyfus at OM.net

Sports venues in Marseille
Robert Louis-Dreyfus
Olympique de Marseille